Lusine Badalyan (born February 2, 1980, in Yerevan) is an Armenian television presenter and politician, who has been a member of National Assembly of Armenia since 2018.

2022 incident
On 28 January 2022 a video appeared in Armenian media where Badalyan is laughing at the Yerablur Pantheon. She was criticized by relatives of the fallen servicemen, and a protest took place in front of the National Assembly building. A few days later, Badalyan apologized for "smiling broadly" in Yerablur.

References

 

Living people
1980 births
Armenian television presenters
21st-century Armenian politicians
Civil Contract (Armenia) politicians
21st-century Armenian women politicians
Members of the 7th convocation of the National Assembly (Armenia)
Members of the 8th convocation of the National Assembly (Armenia)